"Report on the Barnhouse Effect" is the first short story written and published by American writer Kurt Vonnegut. It originally appeared in the February 11, 1950 issue of Collier's Weekly. In 1952, the story was included in the science fiction anthology Tomorrow, the Stars, edited by Robert A. Heinlein. It is also part of the collection Welcome to the Monkey House, published in 1968.

The story was adapted for broadcast on NBC's Dimension X radio program. The episode first aired on April 8, 1950.

Plot summary
The story takes the form of a report written by an ex-student of the story's protagonist, Professor Arthur Barnhouse.  A year and a half before the writing of the report the professor develops the ability to affect physical objects and events through the force of his mind; he comes to call this power "dynamopsychism", while the press adopts the term "the Barnhouse effect". When Barnhouse makes the mistake of informing the US government of his newfound abilities, they try to turn him into a weapon. The program is successful, but Barnhouse, declaring himself the world's 'first weapon with a conscience', flees and goes into hiding. While in this reclusive state Barnhouse uses his dynamopsychic powers to destroy all nuclear and conventional weapon stockpiles, along with other military technologies. However, he realizes that because he is mortal, the world will revert to its warlike tendencies after he dies. Barnhouse passes on the secret of his abilities to his ex-student, who goes into hiding after he begins to manifest them as well.

Notes

References

External links
 
Radio version of "Report on the Barnhouse Effect" (Internet Archive)

Short stories by Kurt Vonnegut
1950 short stories
Works originally published in Collier's